Gadofosveset (trade names Vasovist, Ablavar) is a gadolinium-based MRI contrast agent. It was used as the trisodium salt monohydrate form. It acts as a blood pool agent by binding to human serum albumin. The manufacturer (Lantheus Medical) discontinued production in 2017 due to poor sales. 

Gadofosveset facilitates high-resolution magnetic resonance angiography. Ferumoxytol (trade names Feraheme, Rienso), an intravenous iron-replacement therapy, has been shown to potentially be superior to gadofosveset as a blood pool agent for MR venography in pediatric patients.

References 

MRI contrast agents
Organogadolinium compounds